Le Bas-Cuvier is one of the most famous bouldering sites in Fontainebleau. Due to a remarkably good concentration of boulders, wide variety of problems of varying levels and relative closeness to the town it has become one of the first places that many climbers visit.

Famous problems include La Marie Rose, bouldering's first 6a and L'abattoir, the first 7a at Fontainebleau.

See also 
Fontainebleau rock climbing. 

Climbing areas of France